The 2009 Campeonato Paulista de Futebol Profissional da Primeira Divisão - Série A1 was the 108th season of São Paulo's top-flight professional football league. The season began on January 21 and ended on May 3. Corinthians were crowned the league champion after going through the competition undefeated.

Participating teams

First phase

Knockout phase

Bracket

Semi-finals

|}

Finals

|}

Campeonato do Interior

Semi-finals

|}

Finals

|}

Top scorers

References

External links
Official webpage 
Championship on RSSSF Brazil

Campeonato Paulista seasons
Paulista